is a drama series that aired in Japan on TBS in 2004.

Story
Yuuki Kai (Tsumabuki) is a senior at a university studying social welfare psychology and trying to find a job. One day, he encounters a girl, Hagio Sae (Shibasaki), playing the violin, and becomes intrigued. He eventually discovers that she has lost her hearing, and can now only communicate using Japanese Sign Language. Before they reveal what they think about each other, Sae and Kai must overcome a lot of barriers. They both become stronger along the way, finding their goals.

Cast
 Satoshi Tsumabuki as Kai Yuuki - leading role
 Kou Shibasaki as Sae Hagio - heroine
 Manami Konishi as Maho Takagi - Kai's girlfriend, postgraduate student
 Hiroki Narimiya as Shohei Aida - Kai's friend
 Eita as Keita Yashima - Kai's friend
 Miho Shiraishi as Akane Ozawa - Sae's friend
 Yu Yamada as Soyoko Saeki - one of Shohei's girlfriends
 Jun Fubuki as Yuriko Hagio - Sae's mother 
 Fumiyo Kohinata as Professor Sakaida
 Juri Ueno as Ayumi Kirishima - Shohei's younger sister
 Ikki Sawamura as Haruki Fujii - pianist, Sae's childhood friend
 Takashi Kashiwabara as Sano
 Masaru Nagai as Toru Kakizaki - violinist who used to belong to the same orchestra as Sae
 Eriko Sato as Arisa - one of Shohei's girlfriend
 Ken Mitsuishi as Iwasaki

Ratings

Source: Video Research, Ltd.

Songs
Theme Song
"Sign" by Mr. Children

'OST Tracks by Naoki Sato
 Eternal
 Graceful Heart
 That's Life
 Memoria
 Overcast Sky
 Yo-Yo Comrade
 Liebe
 Anxiety
 As Good As It Gets
 Modest Request
 Precious Seasons
 Sign-Instrumental Version

Other Songs:

Shanghai Honey'' by Orange Range (Episode 5)

Bara no Hana by Quruli (Episode 10)

Gavotte en Rondeau (Violin Piece)

Awards
41st Television Drama Academy Awards 
Best Actor (Satoshi Tsumabuki)
Best Scriptwriter (Eriko Kitagawa)
Best Director (Jiro Shono/ Doi Nobuhiro/ Imai Natsuki)
Best Cast
Best Theme Song ("Sign" by Mr. Children)
Special Award (Orange Days's Sign Language)

References

External links
 

Japanese drama television series
2004 in Japanese television
2004 Japanese television series debuts
2004 Japanese television series endings
Nichiyō Gekijō